Rajesh Mohanan also credited as Rajesh Nair is a film director in Malayalam film industry. He is based in Uganda.

Career
His first movie was in 2013, Annum Innum Ennum His second one was in 2014, Escape from Uganda and the last one was in 2015 Salt Mango Tree with Biju Menon in lead.

Filmography

References

External links
 

Malayalam film directors